Red Feather may refer to:

 Red Feather Development Group, non-profit for Native American communities
 Central Community Chest of Japan, non-profit also known as "Red Feather"
 Name for some Community Chest organizations